Khian Sa is a district (amphoe) in Surat Thani province, Thailand.

Neighboring districts are (from the north clockwise) Khiri Rat Nikhom, Phunphin, Ban Na Doem, Ban Na San, Wiang Sa, Phrasaeng and Phanom. Khian Sa is about 60 kilometres from Surat Thani.

Geography
The district is in the Khian Sa basin, which is crossed by the Tapi River, which also forms part of the eastern boundary of the district. The area of the district is mostly used for palm farming or rubber plantations, while along the river are swamps like the Nong Thung Thong swamp.

The main road through the district is Thailand Route 44, which connects Krabi with Khanom.

History
The district was formed as a minor district (king amphoe) on 15 December 1970, splitting the two tambons Khian Sa and Phuang Phromkhon from Ban Na San District. On 1 April 1974 it was elevated to full district status.

Administration

The district is divided into five sub-districts (tambons), which in turn are further subdivided into 52 villages (mubans). Khian Sa has township status (thesaban tambon), covering parts of tambon Khian Sa. Each of the tambons is administered by a tambon administrative office (TAO).

References

External links
amphoe.com
Khian Sa police station (Thai only)

Khian Sa